The NASA Integrated Services Network (NISN) is a global system of communications transmission, switching, and terminal facilities that provides NASA with wide area network communications services. The NISN services that support the Space Network (SN) include real-time and mission critical Internet Protocol (IP) routed data, as well as high-rate data and video services that connect the SN ground facilities. Inter-Center mission voice communications services are also provided for management of the network and support of user missions.

See also
Ground segment
NASCOM

References 
 Space Network Ground Segment Sustainment (SGSS) Mission System Requirements Document (MSRD).  Section 3.6.1, NISN. NASA/GSFC: November 21, 2008

NASA online
NASA facilities